Epitherium is an extinct genus of Litopterna, who belonged to the family Proterotheriidae. It lived during the Pliocene in South America. The fossils of this herbivorous ungulate were found in Argentina.

References

Proterotheriids
Pliocene mammals of South America
Neogene Argentina
Fossils of Argentina
Fossil taxa described in 1888
Taxa named by Florentino Ameghino
Prehistoric placental genera